In Chinese painting, danqing refers to paintings on silk and Xuan paper. Danqing is painted with an ink brush, color ink, or Chinese pigments using natural plant, mineral, and both metal pigments and pigment blends. Danqing literally means "red and blue-green" in Chinese, or more academically, "vermillion and cyan"; they are two of the most used colors in ancient Chinese painting.

Danqing is typically colorful and vibrant, and uses different colors to depict vivid landscapes, scenery, figures, portraits, plants, and animals. Some of the fundamental colors used in danqing are white, yellow, red, blue-green, and black.

The origin of the word danqing comes from the combination of the Chinese characters dan and qing. Dan refers to dansha (lit. cinnabar), a red or vermillion mineral pigment, and qing refers to qingyu, a cyan or blue-green mineral pigment. Because ancient Chinese paintings often used these two colors, danqing became a synonym for painting in the Chinese language.

Throughout its history, danqing has taken on multiple meanings, and may refer to: 
The minerals dansha (cinnabar) and qingyu (azurite); 
colorful mineral and metal pigments in general;
the colors vermillion and cyan;
colors or all vibrant colors in general;
a specific Chinese painting, and/or Chinese paintings in general;
the art or process of Chinese painting;
painter(s)/Chinese painter(s), artists who mastered the art of Chinese painting; or
historical records

Danqing has a longer storage time than regular plant pigments, and generally does not fade easily. It is often used as a metaphor for faithfulness, such as "danqing is unswerving."

History 
The word danqing has a long history in the Chinese culture and language. It appears often in Chinese classics, historical records, literature, etc. Some of the earliest historical records of danqing include the Rites of Zhou, Guanzi, the Records of the Grand Historian, the Book of Han. It also appears in many other ancient Chinese classics.

Zhou dynasty (1076 BC – 314 BC) 
Danqing was mentioned in the chapter Office of Autumn on Justice of Rites of Zhou (simplified Chinese: 周礼·秋官司寇, traditional Chinese: 周禮·秋官司寇), a text written between 300 BC and 200 BC on the bureaucracy and organizational system of the Zhou dynasty. Danqing is mentioned as one of the minerals in the treasury, which was guarded by officials in the Zhi Jin position.

Spring and Autumn period (722 BC – 476 BC) 

In Guanzi, written by Guan Zhong (720 BC – 645 BC), danqing was referred to as the minerals that can be excavated from the mountain.

Warring States period (475 BC – 221 BC) 
In the Records of the Grand Historian, written in 94 BC, a conversation between Li Si and Qin Shi Huang was recorded during the Warring States period. Li Si argued that Qin Shi Huang should not only use people and things within Qin to build the Qin dynasty, using danqing minerals from the Shu region used in Qin as an example.

Han dynasty (206 BC – 220 AD) 
In the Book of Han, Sima Xiangru (179 BC – 117 BC) described a place called Yunmeng in Chu (state) to the Emperor Wu of Han, stating that the place's soil contained danqing among other colorful minerals.

By the Han dynasty, danqing had been used to refer to the style of Chinese painting. For example, in the Book of Han, Li Ling used the phrase "painted in danqing".

Three Kingdoms (189–263 AD) 
During the Three Kingdoms period, Cao Pi, before becoming the first emperor of Cao Wei, wrote a letter to Meng Da, stating that "danqing draws figures, while historian records the meritorious services and achievements", in which danqing referred to the artist.

Jin dynasty (266–420 AD) 
By the Jin dynasty, the word danqing was extended to mean the process of Chinese painting. In the Book of Jin, published in 648 AD, the Chinese painter and politician Gu Kaizhi was described as "especially good at danqing", in which the word meant the art of painting.

Tang dynasty (618–907 AD) 
In Quan Tangshi (Complete Collection of Tang Poems), Du Fu wrote a poem called Prelude of a Painting: Presented to General Cao Ba. Although the title refers to the Chinese painting, in the verse the word refers to the art of Chinese painting: "".

Du Fu also wrote another poem called Passing by Guo Daigong’s Old Residence, in which Du Fu paid ode to Guo Yuanzhen. When recalling Guo Yuanzhen's military achievements in defending and protecting the Tang dynasty, Du Fu wrote expressing his admiration for Guo by writing: "The general outstanding other famous ministers and the danqing (his painting) illuminates the central pavilion."

Other names 
In his book Some Technical Terms of Chinese Painting, Benjamin March transliterated the word "丹青" using the Wade–Giles romanization system as Tan Ch'ing and translated it as two definitions in English: "red and blue", and "painting, the art of painting".

Famous danqing masters 

In China, ancients called the painter danqingshou, the outstanding painter danqing miaoshou, while common folk called the painter the danqing shifu. 
 Gu Kaizhi
 Li Tang
 Qian Xuan
 Qiu Ying
 Wang Ximeng
 Wu Daozi
 Eight Eccentrics of Yangzhou
 The Four Great Academy Presidents
 List of Chinese painters

See also 
 Chinese painting
 Chinese pigments
 Gongbi
 Blue-green shan shui
 Bird-and-flower painting

References 

Chinese paintings
Chinese words and phrases